Kanchanmala D Pande is a blind international female swimmer. She has won several medals at international, National and State level since she was a child. Her current medal tally stands at 120 including 115 gold, 4 silver and 1 bronze at international, national and state levels. She has competed successfully with sighted swimmers at all levels.

She has always been a  gold medalist at national and state levels.
She has made a remarkable comeback after her maternity by winning three golds in the national championship and intends to participate in forthcoming national and international tournaments including Asian para games.
She is class I officer in the Reserve Bank of India

Honours and awards
Honors and awards	:     
Kanchanmala has been honored with numerous awards, some of the prominent ones being:

1. NCPEDP-Mindtree Special jury Helen Keller award 2021.

2.The National award for Persons with Disabilities in the best sports person category on 3 December 2018, at the hands of Vice President of India Shree Venkaiah Naidu.

3. Featured in "The light within A Different Vision of Life" by Sipra Das 

4. Featured in ‘Nazar ya Nazariya’ National tele-serial by Eye way, and ‘Yeh Hai Raushni ka Karvan’ a National Radio Serial by Score Foundation.

5. "Outstanding Sportsman Special Award" Awarded by IBSA (Indian Blind Sports Association) New Delhi on 10 Jan. 2012.

6."ASPIRE Talent Award 2009" Awarded by H.R.D. Minister Shri Kapil Sibble at Gurgaon (New Delhi) on 27 Aug. 2009.

7. EKLAVYA KRIDA PURASKAR 2008, Awarded by Govt.  of Maharashtra State (at the hand of Governor of Maharashtra Shri Jamir) On 2 Aug. 2009

8."Neelam Kanga Award 2009"   Awarded at Mumbai by Dy. Chief Minister Shri Chhagan Bhujbal on 19 Jan. 2009.

9. Krida Ratna Purskar 2006, Awarded by Commissioner, Amravati Municipal Corporation, Amravati on 29 March 2006.

10. AIASHA Jagatik Kartrutwan Mahila Purskar 2005, Awarded by All India Stri  Heeth Association, Mumbai.

11. March 2004 'Parakh Khel Ratna Purskar' Awarded by Parakh Samaj Kalyan Sanstha, Nagpur.

12. 26 January 2003 Awarded by Vilasrao Balkrushna Patil, Minister Maharashtra state & Palak Mantri.

References

 

Living people
Indian female swimmers
Indian blind people
1990 births
21st-century Indian women
21st-century Indian people
People from Amravati
FESPIC Games competitors